Lac de Bonnal is a lake between Haute-Saône and Doubs, France.

Bonnal